Pyrausta porphyralis is a species of moth in the family Crambidae described by Michael Denis and Ignaz Schiffermüller in 1775. It is found in most of Europe (except Ireland, Great Britain, Portugal, Croatia, Greece and Ukraine).

The wingspan is 15–18 mm.

The larvae have been recorded feeding on Mentha aquatica, Origanum and Helichrysum species.

References

Moths described in 1775
porphyralis
Moths of Europe